Tropical Fish Hobbyist Magazine (abbreviated as TFH Magazine) is a bimonthly magazine geared to hobbyist keepers of tropical fish, with news and information on a variety of topics concerning freshwater and marine aquariums. The magazine was first published in September 1952. The magazine is based in Neptune City, New Jersey. It is published by TFH Publications, which publishes books relating to the care aquarium fish and pets.

Significant Publications
Significant articles published in Tropical Fish Hobbyist Magazine include the 1956 scientific description of the cardinal tetra by Leonard Peter Schultz.

Noted Authors
Several established and well known ichthyologists, hobbyists, and experts have published works in TFH Magazine, including: 
Herbert Axelrod
Leonard Peter Schultz
William T. Innes
George S. Myers
Wayne Leibel
Paul Loiselle
Mark Smith
Robert M. Fenner

References

External links

Bimonthly magazines published in the United States
Animal and pet magazines
Fishkeeping
Hobby magazines published in the United States
Magazines established in 1952
Magazines published in New Jersey
Pets in the United States